Javad Maheri (born December 10, 1983) is an Iranian footballer who plays for Sepahan in the Iran Pro League.

He currently plays as the loan for Mes Rafsanjan football club.

Club career
Maheri joined Sepahan in 2009.

Club career statistics

 Assist Goals

Honours

Club
Iran's Premier Football League
Winner: 2
2009/10 with Sepahan
2010/11 with Sepahan

References

1983 births
Living people
Sepahan Novin players
Sepahan S.C. footballers
Iranian footballers
Iranian men's futsal players
Association football midfielders
21st-century Iranian people